Michael Bolotin is the debut studio album by American recording artist Michael Bolton, who recorded the album under his birth name. It was released by RCA Records in 1975.

Track listing
 "Your Love" (Bolotin)
 "Give Me a Reason"
 "Dream While You Can"
 "Tell Me How You Feel"
 "It's All Comin' Back to You"
 "It's Just a Feelin'"
 "Everybody Needs a Reason"
 "You're No Good"
 "Time Is on My Side" ("Norman Meade", aka Jerry Ragovoy)
 "Take Me as I Am"
 "Lost in the City"

Personnel
Andy Newmark, Bernard Purdie - drums
Wilbur Bascomb - bass guitar
Walt Richmond - keyboards
Patrick Henderson - piano
Fred Bova, Wayne Perkins - guitar
Jim Horn, Dennis Morouse, David Sanborn - saxophone
George Sturtevant - flute
Lani Groves, Marcy Levy, Barbara Massey, Mary Russell (née McCreary) - backing vocals

References

Michael Bolton albums
1975 debut albums
RCA Records albums